Ballal Circle, officially known as Ashoka Circle, is one of the major traffic junction in Mysore city, Karnataka state, India.

Location
Asoka Circle is located between Kuvempunagar and Mysore Palace.
There is an old park near Ashoka Circle commonly called as Ganesha Park with big trees of long growth.

Vishwa Maithri Buddha Vihara 
Vishwa Maithri Buddha Vihara Near Ashoka Circle.  This is one of the Buddhist Vihara in Mysore City With a Mini Prayer Hall and Dome Shaped Exterior as you see in Buddha Viharas Across the world.

Temples
There are many temples in Asoka Circle.  The most important temple is the Anjaneya Swamy temple opposite Sambhrama Restaurant.

Important Landmarks
 
 S.D.M.I.M.D. Women's college
 Nithyotsava Choultry
 Vedanta Hemmige Circle
 Santhosa Hospital
 Mysore Hatha Yoga
 Annapurna Hospitals
 Ashwini Hospitals
 Madhavachar Circle
 Sri Ashoka Stores

Image gallery

See also
 Krishnaraja Boulevard
 Chamarajapuram railway station
 Kuvempunagar
 Ramakrishna nagar
 Chamarajapuram, Mysore

References

Mysore South
Suburbs of Mysore